Robert Trimming Davidson (27 April 1913 – October 1988) was a Scottish footballer who played as an inside forward for St Bernard's, St Johnstone, Arsenal and Coventry City.

Career
Considered a player with great talent and potential – but a variable temperament – from an early age, Davidson made one appearance for the Scottish Football League XI in 1934 while with St Johnstone and scored the Perth club's 1000th Scottish Football League goal.

After moving to Arsenal towards the end of the 1934–35 season he quickly won the Football League title and was seen as a possible successor to Alex James. However, he suffered from injuries and fell out of favour at the North London club after the 1935 FA Charity Shield match and was not selected for the 1936 FA Cup Final victory, and although back in the picture for the next campaign, finished on the losing side again in the 1936 FA Charity Shield. He moved to Coventry City in exchange for Leslie Jones in November 1937.

Having lost what may have been his peak years as a player to World War II, in which he served in the British Army and made guest appearances for several clubs, Davidson played a small number of games for Coventry after the conflict ended, departing aged 35 in 1948. He later featured for local non-league sides Hinckley Athletic, Redditch Town and Rugby Town.

References

1913 births
1988 deaths
People from Lochgelly
Footballers from Fife
Scottish footballers
Association football inside forwards
St Bernard's F.C. players
St Johnstone F.C. players
Arsenal F.C. players
Coventry City F.C. players
Hinckley Athletic F.C. players
Redditch United F.C. players
Rugby Town F.C. players
British Army personnel of World War II
Bradford City A.F.C. wartime guest players
Darlington F.C. wartime guest players
Notts County F.C. wartime guest players
Scottish Junior Football Association players
Scottish Football League players
English Football League players
Scottish Football League representative players
Bowhill Rovers F.C. players